Government Raja Mirasdar Hospital is a state-run hospital located in Thanjavur, Tamil Nadu, India. Established in 1876, the hospital has been providing services to various neighbouring districts including Thanjavur, Tiruvarur, Nagapattinam, Tiruchy, Pudukottai, Perambalur, Ariyalur, Cuddalore, Karur and their suburbs.

History 
In 1878, Tanjore Collector Mr. Henry Sullivan Thomas decided to build a hospital in Tanjore to cater the needs of the people of Tanjore district, he requested the Tanjore-Maratha Queen, Kamatchi Amba Bai for the help and the Queen donated her 40-acre property to the British to build the hospital. Tanjore Raja family's charity contributed Rs. 30,000.

The collector contacted famous mirasdars of Tanjore for donation to build the hospital. Thiruppanandal Adheenam Ramalinga Thampiran, Poraiyar Nadar estate's Thavsumuthu Nadar, Duraisamy Moopanar of Kabisthalam estate and Veeraiya Vandayar of Poondi estate made a generous donation to build the hospital.

Since the donation was received from both the Raja's family and mirasdars, the hospital was named as “Raja Mirasdar Hospital”.

References 

Hospitals in Tamil Nadu